Mohammad Hashem Pesaran (born 30 March 1946) is a British-Iranian economist.

He received his BSc in economics at the University of Salford (England) and his PhD in Economics at Cambridge University.
Previously, Pesaran was professor at the Faculty of Economics at the University of Cambridge and a professorial fellow of Trinity College, Cambridge.   He is the John Elliott Distinguished Chair in Economics at the University of Southern California and has held that position since August 2005. He also serves as the director of the USC Dornsife Center for Applied Financial Economics Research.  In January 2013, he was made a distinguished professor at USC.

He has been head of the Economic Research Department of the Central Bank of Iran and the under-secretary of the Iranian Ministry of Education. He has also been a professor of economics and the director of the Applied Econometrics Program at UCLA, and visiting professor at the Institute of Advanced Studies in Vienna, at the University of Pennsylvania, and the University of Southern California (USC).

He is a fellow of the British Academy, a fellow of the Econometric Society, and a fellow of the Journal of Econometrics.  He is the recipient of the 1990 George Sell Prize from The Institute of Petroleum, London, the 1992 Royal Economic Society Prize for the best article published in The Economic Journal for the years 1990 and 1991, and the joint recipient of the Econometric Reviews Best Paper Award 2002–2004 for his paper on Long Run Structural Modeling.

Pesaran is the founding editor of the Journal of Applied Econometrics, and a co-developer of Microfit (versions 1–5), an econometric software package published by Oxford University Press.

He has been a member of the board of trustees of the Economic Research Forum for Arab Countries, Iran, and Turkey over the period, and has served as a member of the World Bank's Council of Advisers for the Middle East and North Africa, 1996–2000.

Pesaran has served as a director on the board of Acorn Investment Trust and Cambridge Econometrics, and is now honorary president of Cambridge Econometrics.  In 1997 he became a charter member of the Oliver Wyman Institute, serving until January 2000. Between 2000 and 2002 he was appointed vice-president in charge of development and computerised trading systems at Tudor Investment Corporation, Connecticut, US, and in October 2004 he was appointed as director of USC College Institute for Economic Policy Research.

He has more than 200 publications in the areas of econometrics, empirical finance, macroeconomics, and the Iranian economy, and is an expert in the economics of Oil and the Middle East.

His daughter, Evaleila Pesaran, is a Lecturer and Fellow in Politics and International Relations at Murray Edwards College at the University of Cambridge and is the author of the book Iran's Struggle for Economic Independence. His son, Bijan Pesaran, is a neuroscientist at the Center for Neural Science at New York University.

Selected publications
For a full list refer to his personal homepage at Cambridge University.

References

External links
 Personal Website, the Faculty of Economics, Cambridge University.

1946 births
Living people
British people of Iranian descent
Iranian economists
British economists
Alumni of the University of Salford
Fellows of Trinity College, Cambridge
People from Shiraz
Fellows of the Econometric Society
Fellows of the British Academy
Econometricians